Raúl Álvarez Genes (born 5 November 1988), better known as AuronPlay or simply Auron, is a Spanish YouTuber, Twitch streamer, and comedian.

, AuronPlay's YouTube channel has over 4 billion total video views, and he is the third most-subscribed YouTuber in Spain, with over 29.2 million subscribers. He is also among the most popular streamers on Twitch, operating the second most-followed Twitch channel in the world with over 14.7 million followers on the platform, according to analytics company Social Blade.

Early life 
Raúl Álvarez Genes was born 5 November 1988 in Badalona, Catalonia, Spain. Prior to his career as a YouTuber, Álvarez worked at a graphic arts and bookbinding company for nine years starting at the age of sixteen, Raul decided to quit when he was starting to earn more money with YouTube than with his other work.

Career 
Álvarez created his YouTube channel in 2006. His online alias, AuronPlay, derives from the name of Auron, a character in the video game Final Fantasy X. In his first videos, he uploaded videos covering his face with a mask, although he later stopped doing so. Some media such as Marca, WATmag or Movistar have cited that the video uploaded on October 21, 2009 titled "Mis aficiones" (My hobbies) is the oldest on their channel. In 2012, its popularity began to grow with the "video-reviews". In a 2015 interview with Risto Mejide, he explained that he began making YouTube videos as a hobby, intending to commentate internet videos to "transform them into something funny."

In January 2018 he uploaded his most popular video to date entitled "El niño más pesado de YouTube" (YouTube's most annoying kid). During 2020 his video upload frequency decreased, until November of that year, the month in which he published the last video from his AuronPlay channel. Until finally leaving his main channel to dedicate himself fully to his secondary channel and his Twitch channel. Álvarez started a Twitch channel in September 2019, where he broadcasts gaming and social content. In November 2021 he became the second biggest streamer on Twitch, surpassed only by  Ninja, it is currently the second most followed channel on Twitch.

In May 2020, he began participating in a Grand Theft Auto V server of the roleplay genre called Spain RP, where he played the role of Gustabo, along with other streamers. He and his fellow series members announced in August that they would stop playing on that server, which closed on September 3 of the same year.26 Subsequently, he created a new server called Infamous RP, which opened on September 15.

In September 2020, he was watching random wedding-related videos on one of his live streams; In one of these videos, a child could be seen showing his buttocks to the person who recorded the video. The platform decided to suspend his Twitch account for a period of 24 minutes and caused a shower of memes that he shared on his social networks. The platform did not give exact explanations of why they banned him, however some media like Dexerto or Flooxer assumed it was due to that video. In April 2021, he participated in Marbella Vice, a server with the same theme as the roleplay created by Ibai Llanos and CooLifeGame on April 11, 2021, which was one of the most watched events on Twitch.

Other works 
Álvarez has published several autobiographical books, the first of which he presented at the 2016 Madrid Book Fair. With Spanish YouTuber Wismichu, Álvarez performed live shows under the production company YouPlanet: the first was in 2015 at the Cervantes Theater, Málaga, The second was that same year at the Teatro de la Laboral, Gijon and the third was in 2016 at the Teatro Afundación, Vigo.

During 2018, he conducted various interviews with different youtubers and streamers for the Flooxer brand, which belongs to Atresmedia; among them: Lolito, and Ibai Llanos. In 2020, for the same platform he presented the series Ritmo Cardíaco, which consisted of "making a guest nervous", its first episode with the participation of Hamza Zaidi was uploaded together on its main channel and on Flooxer on March 15, 2020.

In December of the same year, he put a line of masks called Auron Mask on sale.

Personal life 
Since 2013, Raúl has been in a relationship with Spanish streamer Sara Moledo, also known by the alias Bjean and Biyín. The couple ended their relationship in July 2015 as he mentioned in an interview, and returned three months later. In February 2021, the couple announced the end of their relationship through Twitch. In June 2021, the couple confirmed that they had resumed their relationship. Álvarez currently lives in Andorra.

Public image 
GQ Spain has described Álvarez as "the precursor to the vlogger world in Spain" and "a successful youtuber in Spain in 2020". In 2016, 20 minutos described Álvarez as "one of the most successful YouTubers of Spain" and "one of the most experienced figures in online video production". In October 2020, Forbes Spain included Álvarez on their list of the 100 best influencers in Spain of the year. In a June 2019 Twitter correspondence, El Salvador president Nayib Bukele named Álvarez the country's "minister of YouTube" by "presidential decree".

Controversies

Hashtag against Gran Hermano VIP 
In 2015, he had made a video in which he criticized the third edition of the Spanish version of the program Gran Hermano VIP; at the end of this video, the youtuber promoted the hashtag #GranHermanoVIH, a play on words between the name of the program and the acronym for the human immunodeficiency virus (HIV). A large number of people criticized the youtuber on social networks, including the reality's official Twitter account, which responded by appealing to the way in which the influencer criticized the program and suggested give his salary to the fight against VIH. He finally had to retract his words. The name of the hashtag was later changed to #GHVIPesBASURA, as it became the number one trend on Twitter globally on the night of January 16, 2015.

Telephone prank to logging company 
Auron, together with youtuber Wismichu, uploaded a video in 2016 in which he made several telephone jokes to different Spanish logging companies. The owner of one of the companies that had received the calls (resident in Córdoba, Andalusia) denounced the youtubers before the Spanish police, as reported by the same on Canal Sur Televisión; He also assured that a large number of calls began to arrive, coming from their subscribers.  AuronPlay and Wismichu, for their part, defended themselves against the accusations, alleging things such as the fact that their video had not showed any phone number or that they had not made calls to people from Córdoba, but to people from Galicia and Catalonia, and that they had permission to publish the calls they made.

Complaint by Josep Maria Bartomeu 
In 2017, due to the resignation of player Neymar from Fútbol Club Barcelona, the fans of this football club began to criticize the president of the team at that time, Josep Maria Bartomeu, AuronPlay began to joke about the situation on social networks, referring to Bartomeu as "Nobita" (appealing to the physical similarity between Bartomeu and Nobita Nobi, character of Doraemon) in the publications in which he made these jokes.

In October 2018, he was notified of a criminal complaint made by president Bartomeu to the Spanish Police for "making comments against Fútbol Club Barcelona, the player and president." The Spanish justice finally decided to reject Bartomeu's complaint and Bartomeu subsequently decided to reconcile with AuronPlay in December 2019 at the Camp Nou.

Accusations of harassment 
In February 2023, Álvarez announced that he would be taking an extended break from content production. Álvarez, along with his long-term girlfriend and a number of other Twitter users, was accused of harrassing the mother of Yéremi Vargas, a 7-year-old boy who disappeared in March 2007 while playing in a lot in Vecindario (Gran Canaria). Álvarez apologised for some of his historic behaviour, and denied a series of other accusations that he had exchanged sexual messages with minors earlier in his career.

Awards and nominations

Works 
 2015: De lo peor, lo mejor: los consejos de Auron. Grupo Planeta
 2016: AuronPlay, el libro. Grupo Planeta
 2016: El juego del hater. Ediciones Martínez Roca

See also 
 List of YouTubers
List of most-followed Twitch channels

References

External links 

 
 

Living people
1988 births
Gaming YouTubers
Spanish YouTubers
Spanish-language YouTubers
Twitch (service) streamers
YouTube channels launched in 2006
YouTube vloggers
Video bloggers
Spanish emigrants to Andorra